Fraser v ABSA, an important case in South African criminal procedure and constitutional litigation, concerned the interpretation of chapter 5 of the Prevention of Organised Crime Act (POCA), dealing with the restraint and confiscation of property that constitutes the proceeds of crime.

In the area of constitutional litigation, the court dealt with the question of its jurisdiction in constitutional matters. The interpretation by the Supreme Court of Appeal (SCA) of section 26 of POCA had been challenged on the grounds that it had failed to promote the spirit, purport and objects of the Bill of Rights, particularly the right to a fair trial. This was a constitutional matter, so the Constitutional Court had jurisdiction to hear it.

On the issue of leave to appeal to the Constitutional Court, the court found that, since POCA was an Act of considerable importance and complexity, and since there were prospects of success in challenging the SCA's interpretation of the Act, leave to appeal should be granted.

Facts 
Section 26 of POCA authorised the High Court to issue a restraint order prohibiting a person who has or will be charged with an offence under POCA from dealing in any manner with any property subject to the restraint order. The High Court also had a discretion in terms of section 26(6) to make provision in the restraint order for the reasonable living and legal expenses of the defendant. This case is concerned with the exercise of that discretion. Fraser argued that the failure to make such provision violated his right to a fair trial, including the right to legal representation.

Fraser was arrested in 2003 and charged with racketeering, money laundering and drug-related offences. In November 2004, the High Court ordered a provisional restraint order against his property, placing it in the hands of a curator. He subsequently applied, in terms of section 26(6), to the Durban High Court for an order directing the curator to sell the property and use its proceeds for payment of the legal expenses in his criminal trial. ABSA, a creditor of Mr Fraser with a four-year-old default judgment against him in its favour, applied to intervene in the proceedings. It opposed the application for the provision of legal expenses on the basis that, if Mr Fraser were successful, it would be unable to recover its judgment debt.

High Court 
The High Court confirmed the provisional restraint order, dismissed ABSA’s application to intervene, and granted Mr Fraser’s application. ABSA applied for and was granted leave to appeal to the Supreme Court of Appeal (SCA).

Supreme Court of Appeal 
The SCA reversed the High Court’s decision. It granted ABSA’s application to intervene and dismissed Mr Fraser’s application for provision for legal expenses. The SCA held that the legislature could not have intended that a concurrent creditor, who had pursued a claim and obtained a default judgment prior to the issuance of a restraint order, would be prevented from satisfying that judgment simply because the debtor’s assets had been restrained. As a consequence of the SCA’s decision, ABSA’s claim against Mr Fraser was secured. Mr Fraser applied for leave to appeal to the Constitutional Court against the judgment and order of the SCA.

Constitutional Court

Jurisdiction 
This Constitutional Court's jurisdiction is governed by section 167(3) of the Constitution, which limits it to constitutional matters and issues connected with decisions on constitutional matters. In matters other than constitutional matters, the SCA is the highest Court in the land.

"To attempt to define the limits of the term 'constitutional matter' rigidly," held Van Der Westhuizen J,

is neither necessary nor desirable. Philosophically and conceptually, it is difficult to conceive of any legal issue that is not a constitutional matter within a system of constitutional supremacy. All law is after all subject to the Constitution and law inconsistent with the Constitution is invalid.

Nor was it appropriate, in a system of constitutional supremacy, to construe the term "constitutional matter" narrowly. Nevertheless, Van Der Westhuizen continued,

the fact that s 167(3)(b) of the Constitution limits this Court's jurisdiction to constitutional matters presupposes that a meaningful line must be drawn between constitutional and non-constitutional matters and it is the responsibility of this Court to do so.

In this regard, a contention that a lower court reached an incorrect decision "is not, without more, a constitutional matter." Moreover, the Constitutional Court would not assume jurisdiction over a non-constitutional matter "only because an application for leave to appeal is couched in constitutional terms." It was incumbent upon the applicant to demonstrate the existence of "a bona fide constitutional question." As Van Der Westhuizen cautioned, "An issue does not become a constitutional matter merely because an applicant calls it one."

The applicant in Fraser had not challenged the constitutional validity of any of the provisions of POCA itself, or of the restraint order. Rather, he claimed that the SCA's interpretation of POCA was constitutionally problematic, Section 39(2) of the Constitution, held Van Der Westhuizen, "requires more from a Court than to avoid an interpretation that conflicts with the Bill of Rights. It demands the promotion of the spirit, purport and objects of the Bill of Rights." The applicant contended that the SCA had failed to promote the spirit, purport and objects of the Bill of Rights, particularly the right to a fair trial. This, Van Der Westhuizen found, was a constitutional matter, which meant that the Constitutional Court had jurisdiction to hear it.

Leave to appeal 
Section 167(6) of the Constitution provides for appeals from another court to the Constitutional Court "when it is in the interests of justice and with leave of the Constitutional Court." The Constitutional Court determines whether it is in the interests of justice to grant leave to appeal "through a careful and balanced weighing up of a number of factors."

The court held that leave to appeal to it in the present matter should be granted,

 because the constitutional matter raised was of considerable importance and complexityl and
 because "it cannot be said that there are no prospects of success."

Merits 
The court upheld the SCA’s decision to allow ABSA to intervene in the proceedings, but held that the SCA was incorrect in holding that ABSA’s claim against the applicant was secured against the provision for his reasonable legal expenses. A decision to allow a creditor to intervene does not automatically result in an order to "ring-fence" its claim against competing claims and the defendant’s claim for reasonable legal expenses.

The court interpreted POCA on the basis of its wording and structure, but also in the light of constitutionally-protected fair-trial rights. When a defendant applied in terms of section 26(6) for provision for reasonable legal expenses in a restraint order, the High Court had a discretion to provide for legal expenses. It also had a discretion to permit any creditor who applied to intervene to join the proceedings, and to then grant an order which was fair under all the prevailing circumstances. In doing so the Court had to take into account

 an accused person’s right to legal representation;
 the interest of the state in preserving the property; and
 the interests of creditors.

Under the circumstances of this case, the court held that it would be fair as well as practical to refer the matter back to the High Court to exercise its discretion in terms of section 26(6) of POCA.

See also 
 South African criminal procedure
 South African constitutional litigation

References 
 Fraser v Absa Bank Ltd (National Director of Public Prosecutions as Amicus Curiae) 2007 (3) SA 484 (CC)

Notes 

2006 in South African law
2006 in case law
South African constitutional law
Constitutional Court of South Africa cases